Nan Love Track is a 2016 Indian Kannada language romance film directed by Kathir, who is best known for his successful Tamil films such as Kadhal Desam (1996) and Kadhalar Dhinam (1999) and Idhayam (1991), making his debut in Kannada cinema. The film stars newcomers Rakshith Gowda and Nidhi Kushalappa in the lead roles.

Cast
 Rakshith Gowda (credited as "Rakku") as Ram
 Nidhi Kushalappa
 Vasishta N. Simha as Raaj
 Achyuth Kumar
 Manoj Kumar
 Sudha Belawadi
 Siddhu
 Anand

Soundtrack

The music for the film and soundtracks are composed by newcomer duo Praveen and Shyam Prasanna. The album has five soundtracks.

References

External links
Nan Love Track Karnataka Tour

2016 films
2010s Kannada-language films
Indian romantic drama films
Films directed by Kathir
2016 romantic drama films